The Zf.Ger.38 is a machine gun of German origin. The weapon is a blank firing training weapon also used for static defence. When the Allies examined the weapons discovered in the German Reich after World War II, they came across a device which was classified as a “spring gun” or “trip wire activated static defense machine gun”.  It  was a practice device with the name “Zielfeuergerät 38″.

Overview
The Zf.Ger.38 is a blowback operated magazine fed training weapon, using 7.92×57mm wooden bullet blanks. The simple construction was sturdily implemented, and reduced to the most necessary functioning parts. The device functions as a blowback operated weapon with unlocked bolt in full automatic mode only.

References

8 mm machine guns
Machine guns of Germany
World War II machine guns
World War II infantry weapons of Germany